Schießbach is a river of Bavaria, Germany. It is a left tributary of the Saale near Hirschberg.

See also
List of rivers of Bavaria

References

Rivers of Bavaria
Rivers of Germany